The 2009–10 was the 98th season in RNK Split’s history. After winning Treća HNL South in the previous season, they earned promotion to Druga HNL. RNK Split finished the season in 1st place in the Druga HNL and earned promotion to 2010–11 Prva HNL.

The club reached the first round of the 2009–10 Croatian Cup, where the team were beaten 2–0 by Slaven Belupo. Ante Žužul was the club's top goalscorer after scoring 12 goals, all of them in the league. At the end of the season, manager Tonči Bašić left the club after he was offered the place of assistant manager when the board brought Ivan Katalinić to replace him.

First-team squad

Competitions

Overall

Druga HNL

Classification

Results summary

Results by round

Matches

Druga HNL

Croatian Cup

Last updated 29 May 2010Sources: Druga-HNL.com, Sportnet.hr

Player seasonal records
Competitive matches only. Updated to games played 29 May 2010.

Goalscorers

Source: Competitive matches

Squad statistics

Sources: Druga-HNL.com

References

External links
 Official website 

Croatian football clubs 2009–10 season
2009-10